Hebei Township is a township under the administration of Tongde County, in eastern Qinghai, China. , it has two residential communities and ten villages under its administration:
Saitang Community
Dou'erzong Community
Saitang Village
Sairuo Village
Geshige Village
Huanghe Village
Xiazhimai Village
Saiqing Village
Saiyang Village
Shangzhimai Village
Jinke Village
Saide Village

References 

Township-level divisions of Qinghai
Tongde County